Mordellistena atrolateralis is a beetle in the genus Mordellistena of the family Mordellidae. It was described in 1917 by Píc.

References

atrolateralis
Beetles described in 1917